Israel at the Universiade has led to 17 medals, 16 at the Summer Universiade and 1 at the Winter Universiade.

Medals

Medals by games

Medals by sport

Medals by year
Summer

Winter

List of medalists

References

 
Nations at the Universiade
Student sport in Israel